Leon was the 14th Agiad dynasty King of Sparta, ruling from 590 BC to 560 BC.

Name 
Leon means "lion". The grandson of Leon had a similar name: Leonidas.

Biography 
Leon is mentioned in the seventh book of The Histories by Herodotus.

He is said to have, like his father, fought to a draw with the Tegeans.

Grandfather to Leonidis (famous king)

Family 
Leon was the son of king Eurycratides and grandson of Anaxander.

He was succeeded on the throne by his son Anaxandridas II, who managed to defeat Tegea.

Family tree

Notes 

6th-century BC rulers
6th-century BC Spartans
Agiad kings of Sparta
560 BC deaths
Year of birth unknown